Maulburg is a municipality in the district of Lörrach in Baden-Württemberg in Germany.

Transport
The municipality has a railway station, on the Wiese Valley Railway.

References

Lörrach (district)
Baden